Peter Cheney is a feature writer for the Canadian newspaper The Globe and Mail.

Cheney formerly wrote for the Toronto Star.

He is the winner of three National Newspaper Awards: 
1991: International Reporting, Toronto Star 
1994:  Enterprise Reporting, Toronto Star
1998:  Enterprise Reporting, Toronto Star

Notes

External links
 CAJ Peter Cheney bio

Year of birth missing (living people)
Living people